Salar Aghili (born 2 December 1977), known by his full name Mir Salar Moslemi Aghili, is a classical and Persian traditional singer.. His spouse, Harir Shariat–Zadeh is a Persian musician who plays piano and daf.

His main teacher was Sedigh Ta'rif. Salar Aghili is the singer of Iran's National Orchestra. He has also worked with a number of Persian classical music ensembles such as Dastan Ensemble.

Biography

He started his career at the age of 8 by playing the piano. Salar is regarded as one of Iran's greatest singers. His song, Faces, which was composed by Armand Amar, was used in the 2015 movie, Human.

Works
 raghse zarat 2017
 Sayehaye Sabz 2002
 Shahriyar 2005
 Daryaye Bi Payan
 Saadi Name
 Be Name Gole Sorkh
 Mayeye Naz
 Asheghi
 Havaye Aftab
 Salar Khaniha
 Eshghe Dirin
Bade Noushin
Sabouye Teshne
Tabriz Dar Meh
Yar o Diyar
To Kisti
Mitaravad Mahtab
Be Sepidie Solh
Yare Mast
Be Yade Man Bash
Naghme Hamrazan

References 

1977 births
Living people
21st-century Iranian male singers
Iranian singer-songwriters
Persian classical musicians